The Cleveland Foundation, based in Cleveland, Ohio, is the world's first community foundation and one of the largest today, with assets of $2.5 billion and annual grants of more than $100 million. Established in 1914 by banker Frederick Harris Goff, the Cleveland Foundation partners with donors to improve the lives of residents in Cuyahoga, Lake and Geauga counties, now and for generations to come. 
The Cleveland Foundation is made up of more than 800 funds representing individuals, families, organizations and corporations. The current president and chief executive officer is Ronald "Ronn" Richard.

The foundation was founded by Frederick Harris Goff, a well-known banker at the Cleveland Trust Company, who sought to eliminate the "dead hand" of organized philanthropy. He created a dynamic, corporately structured foundation that could utilize community gifts in a responsive and need-appropriate manner. In 2019, 1,871 place-based foundations exist internationally.

In its first decade, the foundation accomplished innovative projects to improve the quality of life for Greater Cleveland residents including conducting research surveys to promote public education reforms and understand the relationship between poverty and crime. In 1919, the Foundation's call for an expansion in public recreational opportunities led to launching Cleveland Metroparks.

In 1963, the Cleveland Foundation took over the stewardship of the Anisfield-Wolf Book Award, the only literary prize in the country dedicated to honoring written works that make important contributions to our understanding of racism and appreciation of the rich diversity of human culture.

The foundation has taken a leadership role in fueling multiple revitalization projects including the resurgence of Downtown Cleveland in the 1950s, the rebirth of Playhouse Square in the 1970s and the Greater University Circle Initiative in the early 2000s.

Frederick Harris Goff led from 1914 to 1919. Raymond C. Moley led the foundation from 1919 to 1923. Carlton K. Matson, 1924–1928. Leyton E. Carter led the Foundation for 25 years, from 1928 to 1953. From 1953 to 1967, J. Kimball Johnson. James A. Norton, 1968 - 1973, left the foundation upon State of Ohio Governor John J. Gilligan’s invitation to serve as chancellor of the Ohio Board of Regents. Barbara Haas Rawson served as interim director, 1973–1974. Homer C. Wadsworth, 1974–1983. Steven A. Minter, who had served as the commissioner of public welfare for the State of Massachusetts and first under secretary of the US Department of Education, was CEO from 1984 to 2003. Ronald B. Richard, with experience in the U.S. Foreign Service, the CIA, and the private sector, has led the Foundation since 2003.

Grantmaking
The Cleveland Foundation awards most of its grants to 501(c)(3) non-profit organizations. Some grants are made to government agencies. Grants support Greater Cleveland projects and programs that benefit its citizens, meet community needs and test new ideas. The foundation generally does not make grants to individuals, for-profit organizations, small businesses, endowment campaigns, annual fundraising or membership drives.

The foundation directs two-thirds of its discretionary grant dollars to these priority areas:

Arts and Culture 
Economic and Workforce Development
Education
the Environment
Leadership Development
Neighborhood Revitalization and Engagement
Youth Development

The other one-third is awarded in response to direct requests from the community. In total, the foundation's grantmaking awards approximately $100 million annually.

References

Organizations based in Cleveland
Philanthropy
1914 establishments in Ohio
Community foundations based in the United States
Non-profit organizations based in Ohio
Organizations established in 1914
United States National Medal of Arts recipients